Indigo Valley is a valley and bounded locality in Victoria, Australia stretching approximately between Yackandandah and the Hume Highway near Barnawartha. The Indigo Creek flows through it.

Indigo Valley was formerly part of the Shire of Chiltern but now forms part of the Shire of Indigo, to which it lends its name.

Indigo Valley has a Country Fire Authority volunteer fire brigade and a state primary school called Middle Indigo Primary School.

The population of Indigo Valley was 561 in the Australian 2006 Census

References 

Towns in Victoria (Australia)
Shire of Indigo
Valleys of Australia
Landforms of Victoria (Australia)